Paul Georges Louis Berger (5 October 1834, Paris – 8 July 1910, Versailles) was a French engineer, politician, and art enthusiast.

Biography 
He studied at the École des Mines, and worked as an engineer for the Compagnie des chemins de fer du Nord. In 1867, he helped organize the Exposition Universelle. Nine years later, in 1876, he helped to create the French pavilion for the Centennial Exposition in Philadelphia. This led to his becoming a teacher at the École des beaux-arts de Paris. While there, he wrote a book based on his lessons: L'École française de peinture, depuis ses origines jusqu'à la fin du règne de Louis XIV, published by Hachette.

In 1878, he was a member of the jury at the Exposition Universelle He also served on the jury at the Exposition of 1889. During those years, he made contributions to the
French pavilions at exhibitions in Amsterdam, Melbourne, and Antwerp. In addition, he was General Commissioner for the Exposition internationale d'Électricité of 1881.

He entered politics in 1889, and was elected a Deputy for the Department of the Seine, on the Progressive Republican ticket. He would hold that office until his death. In 1903, he was elected to the Académie des Beaux-Arts, where he took Seat #5 in the "Unattached" section, succeeding Henry Roujon, who had resigned to become the Académie's Secretary. 

Following his work at the Exposition of 1867, he was named a Knight in the Legion of Honor; promoted to Officer in 1878, and Commander in 1889.

References

Further reading 
 Patrick Cabanel, "Georges Berger", In: André Encrevé (Ed.), Dictionnaire biographique des protestants français de 1787 à nos jours, Vol.1: A-C, Les Éditions de Paris Max Chaleil, Paris, 2015, pp.246-247  
 Anonymous biography, with an obituary by F. Frédéric-Moreau from the Bulletin de l'association des anciens élèves de l'Ecole des mines de Paris @ Les Annales des Mines, 1910

External links 

 L'École française de peinture, depuis ses origines jusqu'à la fin du règne de Louis XIV, full text @ Gallica
 Berger's political record @ the Base Sycomore

1834 births
1910 deaths
French engineers
Members of the Chamber of Deputies (France)
Members of the Académie des beaux-arts
Recipients of the Legion of Honour
People from Paris